is the fourth studio album by Japanese rock band Asian Kung-Fu Generation, released on March 5, 2008.

Release
Unlike the band's previous yearly studio albums, the conception and release of World World World spanned almost two years. The album's lead single, "Aru Machi no Gunjō," was released in November 2006, and after spending nearly the entirety of 2007 touring and performing at festivals, AKFG ended the year with the release of its second single, "After Dark." The third and final single, "Korogaru Iwa, Kimi ni Asa ga Furu" was released a month prior to the album's drop.

Despite the significant time span between the releases, both the LP and all three singles were well received. Alongside World World World debuting at number one on the Oricon chart, AKFG was once more selected to produce the opening theme for yet another highly popular anime series, with "After Dark" being chosen as the seventh opening of Bleach.

Track listing

Personnel
Masafumi Gotō – lead vocals, guitar, lyrics
Kensuke Kita – lead guitar, background vocals
Takahiro Yamada –  bass, background vocals
Kiyoshi Ijichi – drums
Asian Kung-Fu Generation – producer
Yusuke Nakamura – art direction

Chart positions

Album

Singles

References 
 CDJapan

Asian Kung-Fu Generation albums
2008 albums
Japanese-language albums
Sony Music albums